Ectoedemia pappeivora is a moth of the family Nepticulidae. It was described by Vári in 1963. It is known from South Africa (it was described from Transvaal).

The larvae feed on Pappea capensis.

References

Endemic moths of South Africa
Nepticulidae
Moths of Africa
Moths described in 1963